is a railway station on the Minobu Line of Central Japan Railway Company (JR Central) located in the city of Fuji, Shizuoka Prefecture, Japan.

Lines
Yunoki Station is served by the Minobu Line and is located 1.5 kilometers from the southern terminus of the line at Fuji Station.

Layout
Yunoki Station consists of dual opposing elevated side platforms. The unmanned station building is located underneath the platforms, and has automated ticket machines and automated turnstiles.

Platform

Adjacent stations

History
It came under control of the Japanese Government Railways (JGR) on May 1, 1941. The JGR became the Japan National Railway (JNR) after World War II. Along with its division and privatization of JNR on April 1, 1987, the station came under the control and operation of the Central Japan Railway Company.

Station numbering was introduced to the Minobu Line in March 2018; Yunoki Station was assigned station number CC01.

Passenger statistics
In fiscal 2017, the station was used by an average of 437 passengers daily (boarding passengers only).

Surrounding area
Fujimi Junior High School
Fujimi High School

See also
 List of railway stations in Japan

References

External links

  Minobu Line station information 

Railway stations in Shizuoka Prefecture
Railway stations in Japan opened in 1938
Minobu Line
Fuji, Shizuoka